Modern equipment of the German Army, list of equipment currently in service with the German Army.

Infantry weapons

Vehicles

Current inventory of armoured vehicles, including number of serviceable and active vehicles is likely to  rise  significantly due to ongoing war in Ukraine due to Russian Invasion of Ukraine which as a side effect caused re-think of Germany's defence doctrine which includes increased defence spending of at least 2% of GDP and initial spend of €100 billion on expanding, improving and updating defence equipment. German Government is yet to outline its defence doctrine in coming months but it quite likely to include formations of additional combat brigades as well as support elements.

Aircraft

References

Bundeswehr
German Army (1956–present)
Military equipment of Germany
German Army
Equipment